The Story of Robin Hood is a 1952 action-adventure film produced by RKO-Walt Disney British Productions, based on the Robin Hood legend, made in Technicolor and filmed in Buckinghamshire, England. It was written by Lawrence Edward Watkin and directed by Ken Annakin. It is the second of Disney's complete live-action films, after Treasure Island (1950), and the first of four films Annakin directed for Disney.

Plot 
Young Robin Hood, in love with Maid Marian, enters an archery contest with his father at the King's palace. On the way home his father is killed by henchmen of Prince John. Robin takes up the life of an outlaw, gathering together his band of merry men with him in Sherwood Forest, to avenge his father's death and to help the people of the land whom Prince John is over taxing.

Cast

 Richard Todd as Robin Hood
 Joan Rice as Maid Marian
 Peter Finch as the Sheriff of Nottingham
 James Hayter as Friar Tuck
 James Robertson Justice as Little John
 Martita Hunt as Queen Eleanor of Aquitaine
 Hubert Gregg as Prince John
 Elton Hayes as Alan-a-Dale
 Anthony Eustrel as the Archbishop of Canterbury
 Patrick Barr as King Richard
 Anthony Forwood as Will Scarlet
 Bill Owen as Will Stutely
 Hal Osmond as Much the Miller
 Louise Hampton as Tyb, aged nurse of Maid Marian
 Richard Graydon as Merrie Man
 Michael Hordern as Scathelock
 Bill Travers as Possie Man
 Clement McCallin as The Earl of Huntingdon
 Nigel Neilson as Merrie Man
 Geoffrey Lumsden as 	Merrie Man
 Julian Somers as Posse Leader
 Leonard Charles Newcombe as a Page Boy to Maid Marian

Production
Production began in April 1951 at Denham Film Studios in London. This was the second film Disney made in the United Kingdom, the first being Treasure Island (1950). These and several other Disney films were made using British funds frozen during World War II. Originally Bobby Driscoll was going to be featured in the film as a boy in Robin's camp, but he was unable to appear in the film because he had violated British labour laws with his appearance in Treasure Island. In Driscoll's absence, the story was rewritten to focus on the romantic relationship between Robin Hood and Maid Marian. Robert Newton, who was originally cast as Friar Tuck, had to be recast with James Hayter after he was cast in Androcles and the Lion. The Story of Robin Hood and His Merrie Men was filmed in 3-strip Technicolor.

Release
The world premiere was in London on March 13, 1952; the New York opening was on June 26, 1952. In the wake of this film a promotional short entitled The Riddle of Robin Hood was produced.

The film was one of the most popular in Britain in 1952, and would eventually gross over $4,578,000 at the American box office.

Critical reception
The New York Times called it "an expert rendition of an ancient legend that is as pretty as its Technicolor hues and as lively as a sturdy Western... (T)he action - the courtly speeches and romance are kept to a sensible minimum - is robust and fairly continuous"; and Leonard Maltin similarly noted a "Zesty, colorful retelling of the familiar story, filmed in England by Walt Disney with excellent cast. Not as personality oriented as other versions, but just as good in its own way"; and the Radio Times wrote, "This may not hold a candle to the Errol Flynn version, but the authentic English locations and fine Technicolor photography make it excellent family entertainment. Richard Todd enjoys himself as the famous outlaw, but is up against strong competition from Peter Finch as the wicked Sheriff of Nottingham and the delightful Hubert Gregg, cast against type as the evil King John."

Home releases
A Laserdisc was released in 1992, a VHS tape was released in 1994 (the Walt Disney's Studio Film Collection) and a limited Disney Movie Club DVD was released in July 2006.  All releases are 1.33:1 fullscreen in monaural (as shot).

A Disneyland Records LP of four songs from the soundtrack with narration by Dallas McKennon was released in 1963.

References

External links
  
 
 
 

1952 films
1950s action adventure films
Walt Disney Pictures films
RKO Pictures films
Films directed by Ken Annakin
Robin Hood films
Films produced by Perce Pearce
Films produced by Walt Disney
Films scored by Clifton Parker
Films shot in London
Cultural depictions of Eleanor of Aquitaine
American action adventure films
British action adventure films
Cultural depictions of John, King of England
Cultural depictions of Richard I of England
Films shot at Denham Film Studios
Films set in the 12th century
1950s English-language films
1950s American films
1950s British films